Julius (II) from the kindred Kán (died after 1234) was a Hungarian noble from the gens Kán, who served as master of the cupbearers between 1222 and 1228. His father was Julius I Kán, a powerful baron during the first third of the 13th century. His brother was Ladislaus I Kán.

Julius II also served as ispán (comes) of Moson (1228) and Bodrog Counties (1234). Between 1229 and 1234, he also functioned as master of the treasury for prince Coloman.

References

Sources
  Markó, László (2006). A magyar állam főméltóságai Szent Istvántól napjainkig – Életrajzi Lexikon ("The High Officers of the Hungarian State from Saint Stephen to the Present Days – A Biographical Encyclopedia") (2nd edition); Helikon Kiadó Kft., Budapest; .
  Zsoldos, Attila (2011). Magyarország világi archontológiája, 1000–1301 ("Secular Archontology of Hungary, 1000–1301"). História, MTA Történettudományi Intézete. Budapest. 

Hungarian nobility
Julius II
13th-century Hungarian people
13th-century deaths
12th-century births
Place of birth unknown
Masters of the cupbearers